Edmund James Hull (born 1949) is an American diplomat. He was the United States Ambassador to Yemen from 2001 to 2004, under George W. Bush.

Biography
Edmund James Hull was born in Keokuk, Iowa in 1949. He is a graduate of Princeton University and the University of Oxford. He was a Peace Corps volunteer in Mahdia, Tunisia.

From 1993 to 1996, he served as a diplomat in Cairo, Egypt. From 1996 to 1999, he served as Director for UN Peacekeeping Operations in the Bureau of International Organization Affairs. He has also served as Director for Near Eastern Affairs at the National Security Council, and Director of the Office of Iran and Iraq Affairs at the Department of State. As a diplomat, he has also served in Tunis and Jerusalem. From 2001 to 2004, he served as United States Ambassador to Yemen. In the spring of 2010, he taught at Princeton University.

References

1949 births
Living people
People from Keokuk, Iowa
Princeton University alumni
Alumni of the University of Oxford
Peace Corps volunteers
Ambassadors of the United States to Yemen
Princeton University faculty
United States Foreign Service personnel
American expatriates in Egypt
American expatriates in Tunisia
American expatriates in Israel